Richter is a surname of German origin ( is German for "judge").

Geographical distribution
As of 2014, 71.2% of all known bearers of the surname Richter were residents of Germany (frequency 1:350), 13.0% of the United States (1:8,649), 2.2% of Brazil (1:28,857), 2.2% of South Africa (1:7,686), 1.8% of Austria (1:1,460), 1.3% of the Czech Republic (1:2,621) and 1.1% of Australia (1:6,626).

In Germany, the frequency of the surname was higher than national average (1:350) in the following states:
 Saxony (1:80)
 Brandenburg (1:121)
 Saxony-Anhalt (1:132)
 Thuringia (1:250)
 Mecklenburg-Vorpommern (1:279)

People
 Adolf Richter (1839–1914), of Pforzheim. German Pacifist, President of the German Peace Society from its founding until his death, President of Eighth International Peace Congress in Hamburg
 Adrian Ludwig Richter (1803–1884), German painter and etcher
 Aemilius Ludwig Richter (1808–1864), German jurist
 Albert Richter (1912–1940), German track-cyclist and World Champion
 Andy Richter (born 1966),  American actor, writer, comedian, and late-night talk-show announcer
 Anton Karl Richter (1690–1763), Austrian organist, son of Ferdinand Tobias Richter
 August Gottlieb Richter (1742–1812), German surgeon
 Bruno Richter (1914–1993), German military officer
 Burton Richter (1931–2018), Nobel Prize-winning American physicist
 Charles Francis Richter (1900–1985), American seismologist and physicist, inventor of the Richter magnitude scale
 Christoph Richter (1596–1669), a mayor of Stettin, Swedish Pomerania from 1659 to 1669
 Claus Richter (born 1948), German journalist
 Conrad Richter (1890–1968), American Pulitzer Prize–winning Western novelist
 Daniel Richter (actor) (born 1939), American mime, actor and choreographer
 Daniel Richter (artist) (born 1962), German artist 
 Daniel Richter (singer), Canadian singer, member of band Eleven Past One 
 Daniel K. Richter, American historian
 Emma Richter (1888–1956), German paleontologist
 Eugen Richter (1838–1906), German politician
 Ferdinand Tobias Richter (1651–1711), Austrian baroque-music composer and organist
 Frank Richter, Sr. (1837–1910), Bohemia-born rancher and entrepreneur in the U.S. and Canada
 Frank Richter, Jr. (1910–1977), Canadian politician; Member of the Legislative Assembly;  Minister
 Frank-Jürgen Richter (born 1967), German entrepreneur; Chairman of Swiss think-tank Horasis
 Franz Xaver Richter (1709–1789), Czech composer
 Gerhard Richter (born 1932), German painter
 Guri Richter (1917–1995), Danish film actress
 Gustav Richter (artist) (1823–1884), German figure- and portrait-painter
 Gustav Richter (1913–1982), German Nazi official
 Hans Richter (artist) (1888–1976), German Dada-artist, filmmaker and writer
 Hans Richter (actor) (1919–2008), German actor and director
 Hans Richter (conductor) (1843–1916), German conductor
 Heinz Richter (engineer) (1909–1971), German engineer and author
 Heinz Richter (cyclist) (born 1947)
 Heinz A. Richter (born 1939), German historian
 Henjo Richter (born 1963), German guitarist
 Henry Constantine Richter (1821–1902), British zoological illustrator
 Henry James Richter (born 1772), artist and philosopher
 Hieronymous Theodor Richter (1824–1898), German chemist
 Ilja Richter (born 1952), German actor, singer and television presenter
 Jan Richter, Czech ice hockey player
 Jascha Richter (born 1963), Danish singer-songwriter; lead vocalist and keyboardist of band Michael Learns To Rock
 Jason James Richter (born 1980), American actor
 Jean Paul Richter (1847–1937) German art historian
 Jean Paul Friedrich Richter (1763–1825), German novelist and author
 Jeremias Benjamin Richter (1762–1807), German chemist who developed the stoichiometry theory
 Johann Moritz Richter (1620–1667), German architect and engraver.
 John C. Richter, U.S. Attorney for the Western District of Oklahoma
 Johnny Richter, American musician; member of rock group Kottonmouth Kings
 Johan Richter (inventor) (1901–1997), Norwegian-Swedish inventor and industrialist
 Johannes Richter (basketball) (born 1993), German basketball player
 Kamila B. Richter (born 1976), Czech-German media artist
 Karel Richter (1912–1941), German spy
 Karl Richter (conductor) (1926–1981), German conductor
  (born 1987), founder and leader of the notorious German Karl-Manson family
 Karl W. Richter (1942–1967), American aviator
 Les Richter (1930–2010), American football player
 Martin Richter (born 1977), Czech ice hockey player
 Martinus Richter (born 1968), German orthopedist
 Matthew Richter (born 1968), American arts producer
 Max Richter (composer), German-born classical composer
 Michael M. Richter (1938–2020), German mathematician
 Mike Richter (born 1966), American ice-hockey player
 Milan Richter (born 1948), Slovak writer, playwright, translator and publisher
 Mischa Richter (1910–2001), Russian-born American cartoonist and artist
 Owen Von Richter (born 1975), Canadian medley swimmer
 Pat Richter (born 1941), American football player; athletic director of the UW–Madison
 Paul Richter (1895–1961), Austrian actor
 Pavel Richter, Czech ice hockey player
 Ronald Richter (1909–1991), Austrian scientist; head of the Argentine nuclear-fusion Huemul Project
 Rossa Matilda Richter, 19th-century circus performer
 Roy Robert Richter (1915–2007), Australian oilman and World War II pilot
 Roy Richter (died 1983), American auto racer, inventor, and businessman
 Sergy Rikhter (born 1989), Ukrainian-born Israeli sport-shooter
 Simona Richter (born 1972), Romanian judoka athlete
 Stacey Richter (born 1965), American writer of short fiction
 Sviatoslav Richter (1915–1997), Soviet pianist
 Travis Richter, American musician; guitarist of rock band From First to Last

Fictional characters
 See Richter (disambiguation)#Arts, entertainment, and media

References

See also
Richter (disambiguation)

German-language surnames
Jewish surnames